Joe Howell (born 6 November 1996) is an English professional footballer who plays as a midfielder. He was released by League One side Crewe Alexandra in July 2016 and is currently a free agent.

Retirement and post-football career
Through boredom, Howell decided to retire from football in 2018. He since taken up the art of Brazilian jiu-jitsu. Within a year, he won a gold medal in  a local competition. Shortly after, he achieved his blue belt.

Personal life
Since retiring from football, Howell has never been happier. He is a simple man, who enjoys the small things in life.

Playing career
Howell graduated through the Academy at Crewe Alexandra and recovered from a broken foot in December 2014 to sign a two-year professional contract in May 2015. He joined Northern Premier League Premier Division side Rushall Olympic on loan in November 2015. He made his debut for Crewe in the Football League on 26 January 2016, coming on for Brad Inman 80 minutes into a 0–0 draw with Bury at Gigg Lane.

Style of play
Howell can play across the midfield or as a winger.

Statistics

Notes
Statistics for Rushall Olympic not known.

References

External links

1996 births
Living people
Sportspeople from Chester
English footballers
Association football midfielders
Crewe Alexandra F.C. players
Rushall Olympic F.C. players
Whitchurch Alport F.C. players
English Football League players
Northern Premier League players